The Left in the European Parliament – GUE/NGL is a left-wing political group of the European Parliament established in 1995. Before January 2021, it was named the European United Left/Nordic Green Left (GUE/NGL).

The group comprises political parties with democratic socialist, communist, and eurosceptic orientation.

History 
In 1995, the enlargement of the European Union led to the creation of the Nordic Green Left group of parties. The Nordic Green Left (NGL) merged with the Confederal Group of the European United Left (GUE) on 6 January 1995, forming the Confederal Group of the European United Left/Nordic Green Left. The NGL suffix was added to the name of the expanded group on insistence of Swedish and Finnish MEPs. The group initially consisted of MEPs from the Finnish Left Alliance, the Swedish Left Party, the Danish Socialist People's Party, the United Left of Spain (including the Spanish Communist Party), the Synaspismos of Greece, the French Communist Party, the Portuguese Communist Party, the Communist Party of Greece, and the Communist Refoundation Party of Italy.

In 1998, Ken Coates, an expelled MEP from the British Labour Party who co-founded the Independent Labour Network, joined the group.

In 1999, the German Party of Democratic Socialism (PDS) and the Greek Democratic Social Movement (DIKKI) joined as full members, while the five MEPs elected from the list of the French Trotskyist alliance LO–LCR and the one MEP for the Dutch Socialist Party joined as associate members.

In 2002, four MEPs from the French Citizen and Republican Movement and one from the Danish People's Movement against the EU also joined the group.

In 2004, no MEPs were elected from LO–LCR and DIKKI — which was undergoing a dispute with its leader over the party constitution — , as well as the French Citizen and Republican Movement, did not put forward candidates. MEPs from the Portuguese Portugal, the Irish Sinn Féin, the Progressive Party of Working People of Cyprus, and the Communist Party of Bohemia and Moravia joined the group. The Danish Socialist People's Party, a member of the Nordic Green Left, left the group to instead sit in the Greens–European Free Alliance group.

In 2009, no MEPs were elected from the Italian Communist Refoundation Party and the Finnish Left Alliance. MEPs from the Irish Socialist Party, the Socialist Party of Latvia, and the French Left Party joined the group.

In 2013, one MEP from the Croatian Labourists – Labour Party also joined the group.

In 2014, no MEPs were elected from the Irish Socialist Party, the Socialist Party of Latvia, and the Croatian Labourists – Labour Party. MEPs from the Spanish Podemos as well as EH Bildu and the Dutch Party for the Animals joined the group, while MEPs from the Italian Communist Refoundation Party and the Finnish Left Alliance re-entered parliament and rejoined. The Communist Party of Greece, a founding member of the group, decided to leave and instead sit as Non-Inscrits.

In 2019, no MEPs were elected from the French Communist Party, the Danish People's Movement against the EU, the Dutch Socialist Party, and from the Italian parties The Left and the Communist Refoundation Party. MEPs from the French La France insoumise, the Belgian Workers' Party of Belgium, the German Human Environment Animal Protection, the Irish Independents 4 Change, and the Danish Red-Green Alliance joined the group.

Position 
According to its 1994 constituent declaration, the group is opposed to the present European Union political structure, but it is committed to integration. That declaration sets out three aims for the construction of another European Union, the total change of institutions to make them fully democratic, breaking with neoliberal monetarist policies, and a policy of co-development and equitable cooperation. The group wants to disband the North Atlantic Treaty Organization (NATO), and strengthen the Organization for Security and Co-operation in Europe (OSCE).

The group is ambiguous between reformism and revolution, leaving it up to each party to decide on the manner they deem best suited to achieve these aims. As such, it has simultaneously positioned itself as insiders within the European institutions, enabling it to influence the decisions made by co-decision; and as outsiders by its willingness to seek another Europe, which would abolish the Maastricht Treaty.

Organisation 

The GUE/NGL is a confederal group that is composed of MEPs from national parties. Those national parties must share common political objectives with the group, as specified in the group's constituent declaration. Nevertheless, those national parties, and not the group, retain control of their MEPs; therefore, the group may be divided on certain issues.

Members of the group meet regularly to prepare for meetings, debate on policies, and vote on resolutions. The group also publishes reports on various topics.

Member parties 
MEPs may be full or associate members.
 Full members must accept the constitutional declaration of the group.
 Associate members need not fully do so, but they may sit with the full members.

National parties may be full or associate members.
 Full member parties must accept the constitutional declaration of the group.
 Associate member parties may include parties that do not have MEPs (e. g., French Trotskyist parties which did not get elected in the 2004 European elections), are from states that are not part of the European Union, or do not wish to be full members.

Membership

9th European Parliament 

The initial member parties for the 9th European Parliament was determined at the first meeting on 29 May 2019.

8th European Parliament

7th European Parliament

6th European Parliament

European Parliament results

See also 
 European Anticapitalist Left
 Initiative of Communist and Workers' Parties
 List of communist parties represented in European Parliament
 Maintenant le Peuple
 Party of the European Left

References 

 
European Parliament party groups
Organizations established in 1995
Eurosceptic parties